Salvia pachyphylla (Blue sage, Mountain desert sage) is a perennial shrub native to California, Nevada, and Arizona. In California, it grows between  elevation on dry rocky slopes, blooming from July to September.

 
In the course of a study of the chemical composition of the flora used in Latin American traditional medicine, Ivan C. Guerrero and coworkers have performed phytochemical studies of extracts of the aerial parts from Salvia pachyphylla and Salvia clevelandii . The major secondary metabolites were isolated from these species and the in vitro cytotoxic effects against five human cancer cells were reported for eight of the compounds obtained: carnosol, rosmanol, 20-deoxocarnosol, carnosic acid, isorosmanol, 7-methoxyrosmanol, 5,6-didehydro-O-methylsugiol, 8β-hydroxy-9(11),13-abietadien-12-one, 11,12-dioxoabieta-8,13-diene, and 11,12-dihydroxy-20-norabieta-5(10),8,11,13-tetraen-1-one, and pachyphyllone.

References

External links
USDA Plants Profile
Jepson manual
Photo gallery
UBC Botanical Gardens

pachyphylla
Flora of California
Flora of Arizona
Flora of Nevada
Flora without expected TNC conservation status